The 2006 Worthing Borough Council election took place on 4 May 2006 to elect members of  Worthing Borough Council in West Sussex, England. One third of the council was up for election and the Conservative Party stayed in overall control of the council.

The results saw the Conservatives suffer a net loss of three seats to the Liberal Democrats although they remained in control of the council. The Liberal Democrats gained a seat in Gaisford and Northbrook wards and both seats in Durrington, with the winner in Northbrook, Diane Jones, becoming the youngest female councillor in Worthing at the age of 22. However the Conservatives narrowly gained a seat back in Central ward. After the results were declared an investigation was ordered when 452 ballots were spoilt in just the one ward of Offington as compared to an average of 30 in other wards.

After the election, the composition of the council was:
Conservative — 23
Liberal Democrat — 14

Election result

Ward results

References

External links
Campaign statements by each party in the Worthing Herald

2006 English local elections
2006
2000s in West Sussex